Bilbao is a Spanish surname of Basque origin. Notable people with the surname include:

Beatriz Bilbao (born 1951), Venezuelan composer
Esteban de Bilbao Eguía (1879–1970), Spanish politician
Francisco Bilbao (1823–1865), Chilean writer, philosopher and politician
Juan Bilbao Mintegi (1900–?), Spanish footballer
Marcelino Bilbao Bilbao (1920–2014), Spanish soldier
Mariví Bilbao (1930–2013), Spanish actress
Pello Bilbao (born 1990), Spanish cyclist
Tatiana Bilbao (born 1972), Mexican architect
Tomás Bilbao Hospitalet (1890–1954), Basque-origin Spanish architect and politician

Spanish-language surnames